K215 or K-215 may refer to:

K-215 (Kansas highway), a state highway in Kansas
HMS Nith (K215), a former UK Royal Navy ship